Cameron Joseph Worrell (born December 14, 1979) is a former American football safety who played in the National Football League. He was originally signed by the Chicago Bears as an undrafted free agent in 2003. He played college football at Fresno State.

Worrell also played for the Miami Dolphins and was signed with the New York Jets.

Cameron Worrell is the son of Dale Worrell and Polly Welk Worrell. His grandfather, Richard Welk, is the nephew of famous band leader Lawrence Welk. He is also a distant relative of American swimmer Michael Worrell.

Early years
Worrell was a two-year starter at both running back and safety at Chowchilla High School in Chowchilla, California. He earned North Sequoia League Offensive Player of the Year honors as a senior. He was also named to the All-Section team, gaining 1,300 yards on 160 carries with 16 touchdowns on offense and two interceptions on defense.

College career
Worrell originally attended Fresno State University, but did not play as a redshirt freshman in 1999 and subsequently transferred to Fresno City College where he helped the Rams to a perfect regular season.

As a junior in 2001, Worrell appeared in 14 games and recorded 31 tackles with two sacks, four tackles for a loss, two interceptions and one fumble recovery.

In his first year as a starter for Fresno State, Worrell earned All-Western Athletic Conference honors. He started all 14 games as a senior and led the Bulldogs with career-highs of 106 tackles and five interceptions, including one returned for a touchdown. He added four sacks, two forced fumbles, one fumble recovery and seven passes defensed on the year.

Professional career

First stint with Bears
Worrell was undrafted in the 2003 NFL Draft, but was signed by the Chicago Bears after a tryout during a post-draft minicamp. He was the only undrafted free agent to make the team out of training camp in 2003.

During his rookie season, Worrell saw action in 14 games on special teams and in a reserve role at safety. He recorded eight special teams tackles on the year and he also recovered an R. W. McQuarters fumble on a punt return.

Worrell played in 13 games during the 2004 season, amassing 16 tackles, a sack and a forced fumble.  He missed the final two games of the season after being placed on Injured Reserve with an ankle injury.

A shoulder injury suffered in Week 3 of the preseason caused Worrell to miss the entire 2005 regular season.

Worrell had the best statistical year of his career to date in 2006. He appeared in all 16 games for the first time in his career and totaled 21 tackles, a sack, a forced fumble and three fumble recoveries. He played in a reserve role against the Indianapolis Colts in Super Bowl XLI, but did not accumulate any statistics.

Miami Dolphins
As an unrestricted free agent the following offseason, Worrell signed with the Miami Dolphins on March 8, 2007. He received a two-year contract from the team worth $2 million and including a $285,000 signing bonus. Worrell suffered a torn ACL in Week 13 and was placed on season-ending injured reserve.

The Dolphins waived Worrell on April 24, 2008 after he failed a physical.

New York Jets
Worrell signed with the New York Jets on June 8, 2008. He was assigned No. 45.

Chicago Bears (second stint)
Worrell after being injured for the whole 2008 season was signed on December 26, 2008 when Mike Brown was placed on injured reserve. He became a free agent following the season.

External links
Chicago Bears bio
New York Jets bio

1979 births
Living people
People from Merced, California
Players of American football from California
American football safeties
Fresno City Rams football players
Fresno State Bulldogs football players
Chicago Bears players
Miami Dolphins players